Xyleutes strix is a moth of the family Cossidae. It is found in India, Indochina, Malesia: "Sundaland", the Philippines, Sulawesi, the Moluccas and New Guinea.

References

Zeuzerinae
Moths described in 1758
Taxa named by Carl Linnaeus